Robbins & Myers, Inc. is a manufacturer of engineered equipment and systems in global energy and industrial markets. There are basically two segments operating in the company, namely Energy Services and Process and Flow Control. In February 2013, National Oilwell Varco, Inc. acquired Robbins & Myers Inc.

Products 

There are two segments in Robbins & Myers.
The company's Energy Services division provides T-3, critical well drilling equipment parts for drilling operations (such as production, pipeline transmission ) of oil and gas.
The company's Process and Flow Control division provides glass-lined reactors and storage vessels, industrial progressing cavity pumps, valve controls and grinders, fluid-agitation equipment.

Operations
In August 2012, Robbins & Myers, Inc. and National Oilwell Varco, Inc. agreed that National Oilwell Varco would acquire Robbins & Myers with about $2.5 billion in cash.  In February 2013, the acquisition was completed after antitrust clearance.

In 2001, the company purchased Romaco N. V. from Brian Fenwick-Smith, the company's founder.

In 2011, the Company sold Romaco Businesses to a group of funds led by Deutsche Beteiligungs AG.

References

External links 
 

Companies formerly listed on the New York Stock Exchange